Alavarium - Andebol Clube de Aveiro, also known as Alavarium/Love Tiles due to the team's sponsorship, is a women's handball club from Aveiro in Portugal. AC Alavarium competes in the 1ª Divisão.

Honours 
 1ª Divisão
 Winners (3) : 2013, 2014, 2015

European record

Team

Current squad 

Squad for the 2016–17 season

Goalkeepers
 Isabel Gois
 Andreia Madail 
 Inès Rocha

Wingers
RW
  Soraia Domingues
  Rebecca Freitas
  Ines Moleiro
LW 
  Bruna Ferreira
  Filipa Fontes
Line players 
  Soraia Fernandes
  Joana Ferreira
  Barbara Henriques

Back players
LB
  Ana Silva
  Mónica Soares
CB 
  Maria Coelho
  Ana Rita Neves 
  Rita Vieira 
RB
  Patricia Fernandes
  Sara Sousa

References

External links
 
 EHF Club profile

Portuguese handball clubs
Portuguese women's handball clubs
Sport in Aveiro, Portugal